First National Bank, also known as People's Federal Building and Liberty Trust Co., is a historic bank and office building located at Roanoke, Virginia.  It was built in 1910, and is a seven-story, granite and buff-colored brick building in the French Renaissance style. It features a Roman Ionic columned main entrance and Doric columns in the main banking hall derived from the Temple of Apollo at Delos.

The first director of the bank was Tazewell M. Starkey (1829-1901). In 1926 the bank merged with the National Exchange Bank, and took that name. "When the community opened up, there were a lot of members of the Jewish community who have served on various organizations. For instance, Arthur Taubman was on the board of the First National Exchange Bank, on the board of trustees. When that became Dominion Bank, his son, Nicholas F. Taubman, served on that board of trustees, too."

It was listed on the National Register of Historic Places in 1982.

References

Bank buildings on the National Register of Historic Places in Virginia
Renaissance Revival architecture in Virginia
Commercial buildings completed in 1910
Buildings and structures in Roanoke, Virginia
National Register of Historic Places in Roanoke, Virginia
Individually listed contributing properties to historic districts on the National Register in Virginia